Jean Massard (17 September 1894 – 3 February 1930) was a Luxembourgian footballer. He competed in the men's tournament at the 1920 Summer Olympics.

References

External links
 

1894 births
1930 deaths
Luxembourgian footballers
Luxembourg international footballers
Olympic footballers of Luxembourg
Footballers at the 1920 Summer Olympics
Sportspeople from Luxembourg City
Association football forwards